Henry L. Williams was the head football coach at the University of Minnesota for 22 seasons, from 1900 through 1921.  The team had a 136-33-11 overall record.  In the Big Ten, the Golden Gophers had a 50-25-5 record and won 8 conference championships.  Thirteen players were awarded All-American status.  Thirty-one players were named All-Big Ten first team.

1900 season

1901 season

1902 season

1903 season

1904 season

1905 season

1906 season

1907 season

1908 season

1909 season

1910 season

1911 season

1912 season

1913 season

1914 season

1915 season

1916 season

1917 season

1918 season

1919 season

1920 season

1921 season

References

Media Guide History Section

Minnesota Golden Gophers football seasons